|}

The December Festival Hurdle, currently known by its sponsored title of the Matheson Hurdle, is a Grade 1 National Hunt hurdle race in Ireland which is open to horses aged four years or older. It is run at Leopardstown over a distance of about 2 miles (3,219 metres), and during its running there are eight hurdles to be jumped. The race is scheduled to take place each year during the Christmas Festival meeting in late December.

Prior to 2013 the race was named the Istabraq Festival Hurdle in honour of Istabraq, who won it four times. The race was run as the Ryanair Hurdle from 2013 to 2018 when Ryanair sponsored the race. Matheson took over the sponsorship from the 2019 running. Former titles of the event included the paddypower.com iPhone App Hurdle, Sean P. Graham Memorial Hurdle and the Bookmakers Hurdle. The race was first run in 1986, and it has held Grade 1 status since 2002. It is often used as a trial for the Champion Hurdle at the Cheltenham Festival. Three horses have won both races in the same season –  Istabraq three times, Hurricane Fly twice and Brave Inca once.

Records

Most successful horse (4 wins):
 Istabraq – 1997, 1998, 1999, 2001 
 Hurricane Fly – 2010, 2012, 2013, 2014
 Sharjah -  2018,2019,2020,2021
Most successful jockey (6 wins):
 Charlie Swan – Novello Allegro (1992), Theatreworld (1996), Istabraq (1997, 1998, 1999, 2001)
Most successful trainer (10 wins): 
 Willie Mullins - Hurricane Fly (2010, 2012, 2013, 2014), Nichols Canyon (2015), Sharjah (2018, 2019, 2020, 2021), State Man (2022)

Winners

See also
 Horse racing in Ireland
 List of Irish National Hunt races

References

 Racing Post:

 pedigreequery.com – December Festival Hurdle – Leopardstown.

National Hunt races in Ireland
National Hunt hurdle races
Leopardstown Racecourse